Thomas Hogan may refer to:
Thomas F. Hogan (born 1938), US judge
Thomas Hogan (MP) (died 1586), English politician
Thomas E. Hogan (born 1959), executive vice president at Hewlett-Packard
Thomas Eric Hogan (born 1971), Irish former footballer
Thomas S. Hogan (1869–1957), Montana politician
Thomas Hogan (artist) (1955–2014), Canadian First Nations artist
Tom Hogan (born 1956), Australian cricketer

See also